The 1984/85 NTFL season was the 64th season of the Northern Territory Football League (NTFL).

St Marys have completed a perfect season and claim there 12th premiership title while defeating the Wanderers Eagles in the grand final by 13 points.

Grand Final

References

Northern Territory Football League seasons
NTFL